The Juno Awards of 2007 were hosted in Saskatoon, Saskatchewan, Canada on the weekend ending 1 April 2007. These ceremonies honoured music industry achievements in Canada during most of 2006. The event was well known for a possible tape delay by the CTV television network so the network could syndicate The Amazing Race.

Ceremonies
Most winners were announced at the Juno Gala Dinner and Awards ceremony on 31 March. This was a non-televised event conducted at TCU Place. At this event, Tom Jackson received the 2007 Humanitarian Award and Montreal-based music business veteran Donald K. Tarlton received the Walt Grealis Special Achievement Award. Gregory Charles, a Quebec-based musician, hosted this gala.

The primary ceremonies of the major awards originated from the Credit Union Centre on 1 April and televised throughout Canada on CTV. Host Nelly Furtado was also the most successful artist this year, winning in five categories: Album of the Year, Artist of the Year, Juno Fan Choice Award, Pop Album of the Year and Single of the Year.

Winners in the following categories were announced during the primary ceremonies:

 Album of the Year
 Group of the Year
 Juno Fan Choice Award
 New Artist of the Year
 R&B/Soul Recording of the Year
 Rock Album of the Year
 Single of the Year

Telecast
CTV originally planned to provide a tape-delayed broadcast from 22:00 Eastern Daylight Time to accommodate an episode of the American version of The Amazing Race. However, the network relented due to opposition over the late timing, and scheduled the broadcast live from Ontario and eastward (19:00-21:00 Eastern) and tape delayed in western provinces (21:00-23:00 local time in British Columbia, Manitoba and Saskatchewan, 19:00-21:00 in Alberta). Quickly afterwards, the network made yet another change, allowing Saskatchewan viewers to watch the ceremony live (17:00 Central Standard) in addition to its previously-scheduled timeslot.

National ratings for the Juno telecast were measured by BBM Nielsen at 912 000 viewers, an inferior result compared to the 966 000 viewers for Global's broadcast of The Simpsons or the 1.03 million viewers CBC gained from its airing of At Bertram's Hotel, an adaptation of the Agatha Christie mystery.

Nominees and winners
Nominees were announced on 6 February 2007.

Artist of the Year 

Winner: Nelly Furtado

Other nominees:
Gregory Charles
Diana Krall
Pierre Lapointe
Loreena McKennitt

Group of the Year 

Winner: Billy Talent

Other nominees:
 Alexisonfire
 Hedley
 Three Days Grace
 The Tragically Hip

New Artist of the Year 

Winner: Tomi Swick

Other nominees:
 Eva Avila
 Neverending White Lights
 Melissa O'Neil
 Patrick Watson

New Group of the Year 

Winner: Mobile

Other nominees:
 Evans Blue
 Idle Sons
 Jets Overhead
 Stabilo

Jack Richardson Producer of the Year

Winner: Brian Howes, "Trip" (Hedley) and "Lips of an Angel" (Extreme Behavior)

Other nominees:
 Bob Rock, "In View" and "World Container" (The Tragically Hip)
 David Foster, "Un Giorno Per Noi (Romeo E Giulietta)" and "Un Dia Llegara" (Josh Groban)
 Julius "Juice" Butty, "Save Your Scissors" (City and Colour) and "This Could Be Anywhere in the World" (Alexisonfire)
 k-os, "The Rain" and "Sunday Morning"

Recording Engineer of the Year 

Winner: John "Beetle" Bailey, "Rain" (Molly Johnson) and "Sisters of Mercy" (Serena Ryder)

Other nominees:
 David Travers-Smith, "The Devil's Paintbrush Road" and "Prairie Town" (The Wailin' Jennys)
 Eric Ratz, "Devil in a Midnight Mass" and "Red Flag" (Billy Talent)
 L. Stu Young, "Fury" and "3121" (Prince)
 Sheldon Zaharko, "Back Up on the Horse" (Barney Bentall) and "Unsung" (Jenny Whiteley)

Songwriter of the Year 

Winner: Gordie Sampson, "Jesus Take the Wheel", "Words Get in the Way" and "Crybaby"

Other nominees:
 Sarah Harmer, "I Am Aglow", "Oleander" and "Escarpment Blues"
 k-os, "Sunday Morning", "The Rain" and "Flypaper"
 Nickelback, "Far Away", "If Everyone Cared" and "Rockstar"
 Ron Sexsmith, "All in Good Time", "Never Give Up" and "Hands of Time"

Fan Choice Award 

Winner: Nelly Furtado

Other nominees:
 Michael Bublé
 Gregory Charles
 Sarah McLachlan
 Nickelback

Nominated albums

Album of the Year 
Winner: Loose, Nelly Furtado

Other nominees:
 Billy Talent II, Billy Talent
 Hedley, Hedley
 I Think of You, Gregory Charles
 One-X, Three Days Grace

Aboriginal Recording of the Year 
Winner: Sedzé, Leela Gilday

Other nominees:
 Blood Red Earth, Susan Aglukark
 Burn, Jason Burnstick
 Seeds, Digging Roots
 Stay Red, Northern Cree

Adult Alternative Album of the Year 
Winner: The Light That Guides You Home, Jim Cuddy

Other nominees:
 I'm a Mountain, Sarah Harmer
 Living with War, Neil Young
 Time Being, Ron Sexsmith
 When the Angels Make Contact, Matt Mays

Alternative Album of the Year 
Winner: Sometimes, City and Colour

Other nominees:
 Not Saying/Just Saying, Shout Out Out Out Out
 Return to the Sea, Islands
 Skelliconnection, Chad VanGaalen
 Trompe-l'oeil, Malajube

Blues Album of the Year 
Winner: House of Refuge, Jim Byrnes

Other nominees:
Acoustic, David Gogo
Colin James & The Little Big Band 3, Colin James
Easin' Back To Tennessee, Colin Linden
The Way It Feels, Roxanne Potvin

CD/DVD Artwork Design of the Year 
Winner: Chloe Lum and Yannick Desranleau, The Looks (MSTRKRFT)

Other nominees:
 Alexisonfire, Garnet Armstrong and Erno Rossi, Crisis (Alexisonfire)
 Tim Domoslai, Treeful of Starling (Hawksley Workman)
 Julien Mineau and Virginie Parr, Trompe-l'oeil (Malajube)
 Garnet Armstrong, Simon Paul, Linda Philp and Susan Michalek, World Container (The Tragically Hip)

Children's Album of the Year 
Winner: My Beautiful World, Jack Grunsky

Other nominees:
 Dinosaurs, Dragons & Me, Donna & Andy
 Join the Band, Ken Whiteley
 Murmel Murmel Munsch!, Robert Munsch
 Snooze Music, Rick Scott

Contemporary Christian/Gospel Album of the Year 
Winner:  Wide-Eyed and Mystified, Downhere

Other nominees:
 Beauty in the Broken, Starfield
 Glory, Manafest
 Pollyanna's Attic, Carolyn Arends
 Smile, It's The End of the World, Hawk Nelson

Classical Album of the Year (large ensemble) 
Winner: Mozart: Violin Concerti, James Ehnes and the Mozart Anniversary Orchestra

Other nominees:
Mozart: Violin Concerti, Jon Kimura Parker/James Parker/Ian Parker/CBC Radio Orchestra/Mario Bernardi
Rhapsodies, Alain Lefèvre and the Orchestre symphonique de Montréal
Saint-Saëns: Symphony No. 3 "Organ", Philippe Bélanger/Orchestre Métropolitain du Grand Montréal/Yannick Nézet-Séguin
Shostakovich's Circle, I Musici de Montréal

Classical Album of the Year (solo or chamber ensemble) 
Winner: Piazzolla, Jean-Marie Zeitouni and Les Violons du Roy

Other nominees:
 Mozart: Complete Piano Trios, The Gryphon Trio
 Mozart the Mason, Jonathan Crow, Douglas McNabney and Matt Haimovitz
 On the Threshold of Hope: Chamber Music by Mieczyslaw Weinberg, Artists of the Royal Conservatory
 Shostakovich: String Quartets 3, 7 & 8, St. Lawrence String Quartet

Classical Album of the Year (vocal or choral performance) 
Winner: Mozart: Arie e Duetti, Isabel Bayrakdarian, Michael Schade and Russell Braun with the Canadian Opera Company Orchestra

Other nominees:
 Adrianne Pieczonka Sings Wagner and Strauss, Adrianne Pieczonka
 Extase, Measha Brueggergosman and the Orchestre symphonique de Québec
 Purcell, Karina Gauvin and Les Boréades
 Wagner: Arias, Ben Heppner

Francophone Album of the Year 
Winner:  Il était une fois dans l'est, Antoine Gratton

Other nominees:
 La Coeur dans la tête, Ariane Moffatt
 Compter les corps, Vulgaires Machins
 La Forêt des mal-aimés, Pierre Lapointe
 Trompe-l'oeil, Malajube

Instrumental Album of the Year 
Winner: Run Neil Run, Sisters Euclid

Other nominees:
 ...and another thing, Joël Fafard
 Café Tropical, Johannes Linstead
 Recording a Tape the Colour of the Light, Bell Orchestre
 Yours Truly, Natalie MacMaster

International Album of the Year 
Winner:  Taking the Long Way, Dixie Chicks

Other nominees:
 Ancora, Il Divo
 Confessions on a Dance Floor, Madonna
 FutureSex/LoveSounds, Justin Timberlake
 Stadium Arcadium, Red Hot Chili Peppers

Contemporary Jazz Album of the Year 
Winner: From the Heart, Hilario Durán and his Latin Jazz Big Band

Other nominees:
 At Sea, Ingrid Jensen
 Hugmars, Hugh Marsh
 Moment in Time, Richard Underhill
 Obsession, Kent Sangster

Traditional Jazz Album of the Year 
Winner: Avenue Standard, Jon Ballantyne

Other nominees:
 Mnemosyne's March, Mike Murley and The David Braid Quartet
 Movin' and Groovin, Jake Langley
 Other Stories, William Carn
 ZHEN: The David Braid Sextet Live, Volume II, David Braid

 Vocal Jazz Album of the Year Winner: From This Moment On, Diana KrallOther nominees:Calling for Rain, Lori Cullen
Fight or Flight?, Kellylee Evans
Messin' Around, Molly Johnson
Start to Move, Elizabeth Shepherd

 Pop Album of the Year Winner: Loose, Nelly FurtadoOther nominees:Atlantis: Hymns for Disco, k-os
Ghost Stories, Chantal Kreviazuk
Stalled Out in the Doorway, Tomi Swick
Wintersong, Sarah McLachlan

 Rock Album of the Year Winner: Billy Talent II, Billy TalentOther nominees: Chemical City, Sam Roberts
 Never Hear the End of It, Sloan
 Tomorrow Starts Today, Mobile
 World Container, The Tragically Hip

 Roots and Traditional Album of the Year (Solo) Winner: Yellowjacket, Stephen FearingOther nominees: An Ancient Muse, Loreena McKennitt
 Milly's Cafe, Fred Eaglesmith
 We Belong to the Gold Coast, Steve Dawson
 When We Get There, Lennie Gallant

 Roots and Traditional Album of the Year (Group) Winner: Bloom, The McDadesOther nominees: Firecracker, The Wailin' Jennys
 Hello Love, Be Good Tanyas
 Let's Frolic, Blackie and the Rodeo Kings
 Migrations, The Dukhs

 World Music Album of the Year Winner: Kaba Horo, Lubo AlexandrovOther nominees: African Guitar Summit II, Alpha Ya Ya Diallo, Mighty Popo, Adam Solomon, Pa Joe, Madagascar Slim and Donné Robert
 Bahiatronica, Monica Freire
 Coeur vagabond, Bïa
 The Edge, Mr. Something Something

Nominated releases

 Single of the Year Winner: "Promiscuous", Nelly Furtado featuring TimbalandOther nominees: "All I Can Do", Chantal Kreviazuk
 "Devil in a Midnight Mass", Billy Talent
 "Pull Me Through", Jim Cuddy
 "Sunday Morning", k-os

 Classical Composition of the Year Winner: "Clere Vénus", Denis GougeonOther nominees: "A Midwinter Night's Dream", Harry Somers
 "Of Memory and Desire", Harry Somers
 "Tumbling Strain", Neil Currie
 "Varley Suite for Solo Violin", Stephen Chatman

 Country Recording of the Year Winner: Somebody Wrote Love, George CanyonOther nominees: Big Wheel, Aaron Pritchett
 Countrified, Emerson Drive
 Doc Walker, Doc Walker
 Love & Negotiation, Carolyn Dawn Johnson

 Dance Recording of the Year Winner: Sexor, TigaOther nominees: "Airbreak", Danny D
 "Lift Off", Taras
 "(Maybe You'll Get) Lucky", The Sound Bluntz
 The Remix Album, Champion

 Music DVD of the Year Winner: Escarpment Blues, Sarah HarmerOther nominees: It's Not Fun. Don't Do It!, Tegan and Sara
 Try This at Home, Hedley
 R30, Rush
 Rock Swings - Live, Paul Anka

 R&B/Soul Recording of the Year Winner: mySOUL,  jacksoulOther nominees:"Life Less Ordinary",  Deesha
"Believe",  George
"Face Behind The Face",  Karl Wolf
"Been Gone", Keshia Chanté

 Rap Recording of the Year Winner: Black Magic, Swollen MembersOther nominees: The Answer, Rich London
 The Frenzy of Renown, Arabesque
 Hitch Hikin' Music, Classified
 Organic Music for a Digital World, DL Incognito

 Reggae Recording of the Year Winner: Xrated, KorexionOther nominees: Hard to See, Humble
 In the Streets, Trinity Chris feat. Blessed
 Kulcha Connection, Kulcha Connection
 Survival, Kwesi Selassie

 Video of the Year Winner: Dave Pawson and Jonathan Legris, "Bridge to Nowhere" (Sam Roberts)Other nominees:'
 Sean Michael Turrell, "Devil in a Midnight Mass" (Billy Talent)
 Floria Sigismondi, "Hurt" (Christina Aguilera)
 Drew Lightfoot, "Coast Is Clear" (In-Flight Safety)
 k-os, Micah Meisner and Zeb Roc, "ElectriK HeaT: The Seekwill" (k-os)

Compilation CD
A compilation album of the awards was released in 2007

Track list
 Nelly Furtado feat. Timbaland "Promiscuous" 4:03
 k-os "Sunday Morning" 3:47
 Chantal Kreviazuk "All I Can Do" 3:36
 Sam Roberts "Bridge To Nowhere" 3:10
 Billy Talent "Devil In A Midnight Mass" 2:54
 Mobile "Montreal Calling" 3:07
 Nickelback "Far Away" 3:59
 Melissa O'Neil "Speechless" 4:04
 Diana Krall "Little Girl Blue" 5:39
 Loreena McKennitt "Caravanserai" 3:54
 Pierre Lapointe "Deux Par Deux Rassemblés" 3:50
 Jim Cuddy "Pull Me Through" 4:45
 Eva Avila "Meant To Fly" 3:27
 Stabilo "Flawed Design" 3:47
 The Tragically Hip "In View" 3:59
 Hedley "Gunnin 4:11
 Three Days Grace "Animal I Have Become" 3:52
 Alexisonfire "This Could Be Anywhere In The World" 4:02

References

External links 
Juno Awards site

2007
2007 in Canadian music
2007 music awards
March 2007 events in Canada
April 2007 events in Canada
2007 in Saskatchewan
Culture of Saskatoon